Robert "Bob" Morton (9 March 1944 – 21 March 1995) was an Australian rules footballer who played with St Kilda in the Victorian Football League (VFL).

Morton, who came from the Hampton Scouts, played his football as a forward. He kicked 21 goals from 13 games in 1964 and during this time also played district cricket for St Kilda. As a cricketer he was good enough to represent the Victorian Colts.

He was St Kilda's 19th man in the 1965 VFL Grand Final, which was won by Essendon. The following season, St Kilda claimed their first ever premiership but Morton missed out, having spent the entire year out of the seniors due to injury.

In 1967 he joined South Bendigo, in the Bendigo Football League. He topped the league goal-kicking in 1968 with 108 goals.

References

Australian rules footballers from Victoria (Australia)
St Kilda Football Club players
South Bendigo Football Club players
1944 births
1995 deaths